Dickson Interchange is a transport interchange in Dickson, an inner-northern suburb of Canberra. The interchange allows transfers between the Canberra Metro light rail network and local ACTION bus services. As part of the construction of the Civic to Gungahlin light rail line, a new $4 million bus interchange opened in 2018. The interchange was built on land compulsorily acquired by the ACT Government in 2015, the terms of which were not disclosed to the public. Construction allowed direct access for bus and pedestrian traffic between Northbourne Avenue and Challis Street, as well as accommodation for up to nine local bus routes, a new taxi rank, kiss and ride facilities and signalised pedestrian crossings. The new facilities became an important connection point for commuters under a redesigned timetable that integrated bus and light rail services in early 2019.

Between the station's opening and February 2020, 11% of all light rail passengers boarded or alighted at Dickson Interchange, making it the busiest intermediate station on the line.

Services
The light rail platforms are located in the central median of Northbourne Avenue, while most bus services depart from a dedicated thoroughfare connecting to Cape Street. Additional shelters are provided on both sides of Northbourne Avenue to service light rail replacement buses when required.

Light rail

ACTION bus services

References

Bus stations in Australia
Bus transport in Canberra
Transport buildings and structures in the Australian Capital Territory
Light rail stations in Canberra
Transport in Canberra
Railway stations in Australia opened in 2019